Llewellyn Riley (born 17 September 1972) is a Barbadian former footballer, who played as a striker.

International career
Riley represented Barbados at the international level over a span of 10 years. With 23 goals, he is the all-time top scorer for the Barbados national team.

Career statistics

International goals 
Scores and results list Barbados' goal tally first.

References

External links

1972 births
Living people
Barbadian footballers
Barbadian expatriate footballers
Barbados international footballers
Barbadian expatriate sportspeople in Ireland
Association football forwards
Galway United F.C. (1937–2011) players
Sligo Rovers F.C. players
notre Dame SC players
Expatriate association footballers in the Republic of Ireland